Daiei may refer to:

 Daiei, a Japanese supermarket chain
 Daiei (era), a Japanese historical era
 Daiei Film, a Japanese film studio that went bankrupt and was acquired by Kadokawa Pictures
 Daiei Unions (大映ユニオンズ), a baseball team owned by Daiei Film
 Daiei Television (大映テレビ), a company formerly belonging to Daiei Film
 Daiei, Tottori, a town in Tottori Prefecture